Epione vespertaria, the dark bordered beauty, is a moth of the family Geometridae.

Description
The wingspan is 25–30 mm. Adults are sexually dimorphic. In the males the wings are darker and more yellow ocher in colour, while in the females they are pale yellow. Both sexes show on the wings a purplish-grey border of even width (hence the Latin name Epione paralellaria). On the forewings and on the hindwings there is a small black spot. Adults are on wing from the end of June to September in one generation.

The caterpillars are brown or violet-brown with a whitish tinge underside. They feed on birch (Betula species), hazel (Corylus avellana), aspen (Populus tremula) and willow (Salix species). Larvae can be found from May to June. The species overwinters as an egg.

Distribution
The dark bordered beauty is widespread from western Europe to the Amur River.

Habitat
This species can be found in many different habitats (plains, mountains, wet heathlands, damp woodlands, etc.).

Subspecies
Epione vespertaria vespertaria
Epione vespertaria amura Wehrli, 1940

Gallery

References
Peder Skou -  The Geometroid Moths of North Europe (Lepidoptera: Drepanidae and Geometridae)

External links
Arkive
Caterpillar on Kolumbus
Lepiforum.de
UK Moths

Ourapterygini
Moths described in 1767
Moths of Asia
Moths of Europe
Taxa named by Carl Linnaeus